Villahoz is a village and municipality in the Province of Burgos, Spain. The village is in the wine region known as Ribera del Arlanza, 15 km from Lerma.

References

External links
Guide about Villahoz

Municipalities in the Province of Burgos